J. L. Eve Construction was a civil engineering company from south London.

History

It was formed on 8 February 1930 by John Leonard Eve (3 February 1887 - 25 June 1954) from Aveley in Essex. In 1924 he was appointed as the Chief Engineer for the river crossings of the Scottish area of the Central Electricity Board (CEB, which existed from 1926 to 1947). He worked with Robert Chandler-Brown. The CEGB came into existence in 1957. J.L. Eve left a son and a daughter.

Chain Home and National Grid
In the 1930s it built steel-lattice towers for the new National Grid and for the Chain Home transmitters. The electrical cable was often supplied by Pirelli UK of Eastleigh in Hampshire (now Prysmian Group).

The Air Ministry had contacted the company to build two test radar transmitters, one on the south coast, and one on Orkney. After 1939, the company extended it to over fifty radar sites. It built the first part of the supergrid in 1952 from Tilbury to Elstree - with a 275kV voltage instead of 132kV and 136 ft instead of 85 ft, with 45 miles for the British Electricity Authority

Ownership
From 1982 to 1988 it was known as Eve Construction. It would later be known as Eve Group plc from April 1988, then Eve Group Ltd and Babcock Networks Ltd from 2004. It was bought by the Peterhouse Group plc in January 2000.

Babcock Networks, its successor, is situated off the M1 at Sherwood Park at Annesley, next to E.ON UK; its training base is at the former RAF Newton in Nottinghamshire.

Sponsorship
From 1982 to 2000, it sponsored the Surrey Championship (cricket), being replaced by Castle Lager.

Structure
It was based at Minster House on Plough Lane in Tooting. It was based south of Summerstown on the B235, north of Haydons Road railway station (on the A218).

Divisions

Later divisions of Eve Group were:
 Eve Arclive, formed on 18 June 1976 - electrical contracting, later it became Eve Power
 Trakway, later known as Eve Trakway and now known as Live (Trakway) and based in Bramley Vale and Doe Lea in Ault Hucknall near Glapwell in Derbyshire off the A617, east of the Heath Interchange M1 junction 29, and supplies crowd control barriers and temporary fencing. It is owned by Ashtead Group, who trade as A-Plant. In 2002 Eve Trakway built the Super Fortress security fence for the Glastonbury Festival. Eve Construction Trakway was at Lower Heyford, then moved to Sutton-in-Ashfield in the 1970s.
 Eve Telecom

Eve Transcom, comprised
 Eve Transmission - carried out construction and repair of transmission lines for the National Grid
 Eve Cellular - in late 1999, it had built over 7,000 mobile phone base stations throughout the 1990s
 Eve Engineering Design Services 
 Eve Structures

Products

It built structural steel fabricated buildings or structures.

 Electrical substations

Transmitters
 Bilsdale transmitting station on the North York Moors
 Divis transmitting station (500 ft), carries television for eastern Northern Ireland in the mid-1950s
 Durris transmitting station; 38-year-old Thomas Sutherland of Blairgowrie died in its construction on 24 October 1966, falling 175 ft from 300 ft up the mast; the company had a regional office in Edinburgh
 The original Emley Moor steel-tube mast, which collapsed on 19 March 1969.; also built the 50-ton 180 ft top steel lattice, on the top of the current structure in December 1970
 Meldrum transmitting station (500 ft) on Core Hill carries national radio in north-east Scotland, in the mid-1950s
 Selkirk transmitting station in 1961/62, which is 925 ft above sea level
 Skelton Transmitting Station, the tallest structure in the UK at 365 metres, and was built in the war for clandestine broadcasts, now a few miles west of the M6, north of Penrith
 Start Point transmitting station on the most southern point of the Devon coast, in the late 1930s
 Stockland Hill transmitting station, in the east of Devon, towards Dorset, for the IBA in 1961 for 405-line b/w television
 Tacolneston transmitting station for the new BBC East services; the site was known for many years first as the Norwich television transmitter
 Woofferton transmitting station, at Woofferton in the south of Shropshire, on the Herefordshire boundary, important in clandestine broadcasts in the Second World War

Powerlines
 Aust Severn Powerline Crossing (488 ft tall) - the longest powerline crossing in the United Kingdom at 1700 m (5,310 ft) between towers (built around 1955)
 275kV line from Beauly to Kintore, Aberdeenshire in 1960, for the North of Scotland Hydro-Electric Board
 Llantarnam to Crumlin

See also
 Bierrum, (Danish) builder of Britain's cooling towers
 Powerline river crossings in the United Kingdom
 :Category:Telecommunications infrastructure

References

External links
 Grace's Guide
 Eve Trakway
 Eve family tree
 

British companies established in 1930
Companies based in the London Borough of Merton
Companies formerly listed on the London Stock Exchange
Construction and civil engineering companies established in 1930
Construction and civil engineering companies of the United Kingdom
National Grid (Great Britain)
Structural steel
Technology companies established in 1930
1930 establishments in England